Peru is scheduled to compete at the 2023 Pan American Games in Santiago, Chile from October 20 to November 5, 2023. This was Peru's 18th appearance at the Pan American Games, having competed at every Games since 1951, except for the second edition in 1955.

Competitors
The following is the list of number of competitors (per gender) participating at the games per sport/discipline.

Archery

Peru qualified two archers during the 2022 Pan American Archery Championships.

Women

Canoeing

Sprint
Peru qualified a total of 3 sprint athletes (one man and two women).

Men

Women

Cycling

BMX
Peru qualified two cyclists (one man and one woman) in BMX race through the UCI World Rankings.

Racing

Fencing

Peru qualified a team of five fencers (one man and four women) through the 2022 Pan American Fencing Championships in Ascuncion, Paraguay.

Individual

Team

Karate

Peru qualified a team of 3 karatekas (one man and two women) at the 2022 South American Games. Besides, Peru qualified 1 extra karateka after winning one category during the 2021 Junior Pan American Games.

Kumite 

Kata

Modern pentathlon

Peru qualified three modern pentathletes (two men and one woman).

Sailing

Peru has qualified 4 boats for a total of 6 sailors.

Men

Women

Mixed

Shooting

Peru qualified a total of 16 shooters in the 2022 Americas Shooting Championships. Peru also qualified four shooters during the 2022 South American Games.

Men
Pistol and rifle

Men
Shotgun

Women
Pistol and rifle

Shotgun

Softball

Peru qualified a women's team (of 18 athletes) by virtue of its campaign in the 2022 Pan American Championships.

Summary

Surfing

Peru qualified two male surfers.

Artistic

Race

Tennis

Peru qualified one male athlete after winning the singles tournament in the 2021 Junior Pan American Games.

Men

Water skiing

Peru qualified four water skiers after the 2022 Pan American Water skiing Championship.

Water skiing
Men

Women

Wrestling

Peru qualified two wrestlers (Greco-Roman: 60 kg and 67 kg) through the 2022 Pan American Wrestling Championships held in Acapulco, Mexico. 

Men

See also
Peru at the 2024 Summer Olympics

References

Nations at the 2023 Pan American Games
2023
2023 in Peruvian sport